Yuan Zhongyi (袁仲一, born 1932) is a Chinese archaeologist.

Biography
He is best known for his work in the excavation and preservation of the Terracotta Army in Xi'an, China and is praised as "the father of the Terracotta Warriors".

Yuan graduated from East China Normal University in Shanghai where he received the bachelor's and master's degrees of history respectively in 1960 and 1963.

References
Europa Publications: The International Who's Who 2004. Routledge 2003, p. 1861-1862

Chinese archaeologists
Living people
1932 births
East China Normal University